Ruth Grosman Winter (born May 29, 1930) is an American journalist and science writer.

Biography

Ruth Grosman was born in Newark, New Jersey. She graduated B.A. from Upsala College in 1951, and obtained a Master of Science from Pace University in 1989.

Winter worked as a journalist (1951–1955) and science editor (1956–1959) for the Newark Star Ledger. She worked as a columnist for the Los Angeles Times Syndicate (1974–1978) and from 1981, the Register and Tribune Syndicate. She has written on food safety, health and medicine. Winter is a past President of the American Society of Journalists and Authors (1977–1978).

She married Arthur Winter, a neurosurgeon, on June 16, 1955; he died in 2011. She has several children.

Awards and honors
She received awards from the Arthritis Foundation, the American Dental Association and the American Society of Anesthesiologists.

Selected works

References

External links

1930 births
Living people
American cookbook writers
American women journalists
American science writers
Pace University alumni
Upsala College alumni
Writers from Newark, New Jersey
American non-fiction writers
21st-century American women writers